"She Talks to Angels" is a song by American rock band the Black Crowes. It is the eighth track on their first album, Shake Your Money Maker (1990), and was the fourth single released from the album in 1991. The song reached number 30 on the US Billboard Hot 100, number one on the Billboard Album Rock Tracks chart, and number 21 in New Zealand.

Background
In 2010, Chris Robinson explained in a webisode (part of a promotional internet series for the band's 2010 Croweology album) that the song is loosely based on a "goth girl" he was acquainted with in Atlanta who was "into heroin".

Track listings

US 7-inch and cassette single
A. "She Talks to Angels" (album version) – 5:30
B. "She Talks to Angels" (live video version) – 6:10

European maxi-CD single
 "She Talks to Angels" – 5:30
 "Could I Have Been So Blind" (live) – 3:42
 "Jealous Again" (acoustic) – 4:43

European 7-inch single
A. "She Talks to Angels" – 5:30
B. "Could I Have Been So Blind" (live) – 3:42

Australian CD and cassette single
 "She Talks to Angels" (edit)
 "She Talks to Angels" (acoustic version)

Charts

Weekly charts

Year-end charts

Release history

Covers
The song was covered by Brent Smith and Zach Myers of the American hard rock band Shinedown on their 2014 Acoustic Sessions EP. It was also covered by Mark Morton of the American heavy metal band Lamb of God on his 2020 solo EP Ether, featuring Lzzy Hale on vocals.

See also
 List of Billboard Mainstream Rock number-one songs of the 1990s

References

The Black Crowes songs
1990 songs
1991 singles
American Recordings (record label) singles
Songs about heroin
Songs written by Chris Robinson (singer)
Songs written by Rich Robinson